A list of Portuguese films that were first released in 2003.

See also
2003 in Portugal

References

2003
Lists of 2003 films by country or language
2003 in Portugal